Centerville is an unincorporated community in Boone County, in the U.S. state of Iowa.

History
Centerville was platted in 1855, but the town's growth soon failed to meet the expectations of its founders. The town's mill was destroyed in 1858, and the Centerville dwindled in importance. By 1914, Centerville contained but a "half dozen houses".

References

Unincorporated communities in Boone County, Iowa
Unincorporated communities in Iowa
1855 establishments in Iowa